Plasticosis is a form of fibrotic scarring that is caused by small pieces of plastic which inflame the digestive tract. 

A 2023 study by Hayley Charlton-Howard, Alex Bond, Jack Rivers-Auty, and Jennifer Lavers, found that plastic pollution caused disease in seabirds. The researchers coined the term plasticosis to indicate the first recorded instance of plastic-induced fibrosis in wild animals.  “Further, the ingestion of plastic has far-reaching and severe consequences, many of which we are only just beginning to fully document and understand.”  The diseases is caused only by plastic according to the study. 

Plasticosis is a pathological wound healing in which connective tissue replaces normal parenchymal tissue to the extent that it goes unchecked, leading to considerable tissue remodelling and the formation of permanent scar tissue.
Repeated injuries, chronic inflammation and repair are susceptible to fibrosis where an accidental excessive accumulation of extracellular matrix components, such as the collagen is produced by fibroblasts, leading to the formation of a permanent fibrotic scar.

Pathogenesis
Plasticosis was first identified in Flesh-footed Shearwaters (Ardenna carneipes) on Lord Howe Island, Australia. Previous research on this population found that ~90% of necropsied chicks contained ingested plastics, which are thought to negatively affect chick growth and survival. Microscopic pieces of plastic have also been found embedded in tissues of this species, causing inflammation and tissue damage, as well as loss of tubular glands and rugae.
Plastic-induced fibrosis has been previously demonstrated in recent laboratory studies, in organs such as the heart, liver, ovaries, and uterus. 

Plasticosis is found to cause increased collagen prevalence in the tubular glands and submucosa, and widespread scar tissue formation across the whole organ, leading to extensive reorganisation and tissue damage, and potentially a loss of tissue function. Since tubular glands produce mucus to protect the epithelium, as well as fluids that are crucial for digestion and nutrient absorption, plasticosis may affect the ability of birds to prevent injury or infection in the stomach and reduce stomach function. Excessive scar tissue formation in the stomach wall and loss of rugae induced by plastics may also reduce the ability of the stomach to expand, potentially reducing stomach capacity and function. 
Plasticosis has been compared to asbestosis and silicosis, where plastic acts a similar persistent irritant leading to fibrosis.

See also 
 Marine plastic pollution
 Marine pollution
 Microplastics
 Plastic pollution
 Seabird

References

Bird diseases
Plastics and the environment
Pollution